Věra Špinarová (22 December 1951 – 26 March 2017) was a Czech singer. She was born in Pohořelice, Czechoslovakia, and moved to Ostrava, now Czech Republic, with her parents at the age of seven. She learned to play the violin as a child.

She performed with the Flamingo band in the late 1960s. Her first LP entitled Andromeda came out in 1972 under the Panton label, the rest were published under the Supraphon label. In 1972 she married Ivo Pavlík. They divorced in 1984. Her second husband, Vítězslav Vávra, was a singer and drummer.

On 26 March 2017, Špinarova suffered a heart attack at a concert in Čáslav and died. Days prior, she appeared alongside Martin Dejdar, who imitated her, on stage in the Czech version of Your Face Sounds Familiar.

Discography
Source:
 1972 Andromeda
 1976 Životopis
 1979 Věra Špinarová 3
 1982 Meteor lásky
 1984 Stíny výsluní
 1985 Věra Špinarová & Speciál '85
 1986 Věra Špinarová 7
 1989 Jednoho dne se vrátiš (compilation)
 1993 ... a pořád tě mám ráda
 1994 Já si broukám
 1996 Když se láskám stýská
 1996 Andromeda
 2000 Největší hity (compilation)
 2001 Za vše můžu já
 2002 Největší hity 2 (compilation)
 2003 Věra Špinarová 1 Jednoho dne se vrátíš (compilation) 
 2003 Věra Špinarová 2 Letní ukolébavka (compilation)
 2004 To nejlepší (compilation)
 2005 Čas můj za to stál
 2005 Když se láskám stýská
 2011 Jednoho dne se vrátíš/Zlatá kolekce (3CD compilation)

References

External links
 Official website

1951 births
2017 deaths
People from Pohořelice
20th-century Czech women singers
Musicians from Ostrava
21st-century Czech women singers
Czechoslovak women singers